Item is a 2019 South Korean television series based on the KakaoPage webtoon series of the same name and set to be a mystery fantasy drama. It stars Ju Ji-hoon, Jin Se-yeon, Kim Kang-woo and Kim Yoo-ri. It aired on MBC from February 11 to April 2, 2019.

Synopsis
A prosecutor and a criminal profiler work together in their attempts to decipher the secrets behind various mysterious items which have special powers.

Cast

Main
 Ju Ji-hoon as Kang Gon / Kim Sung-kyu
 Kim Young-dae as young Kang Gon / Kim Sung-kyu
A prosecutor who tries very hard to save his niece while also finding himself entangled in a mystery of supernatural items.
 Jin Se-yeon as Shin So-young
A criminal profiler who possesses a lot of skills and, even when confronted to shocking crime scenes, stays composed.
 Kim Kang-woo as Jo Se-hwang
Vice chairman of the Hwawon Group who is also a sociopath who collects items with supernatural powers by using his power and wealth. He murders anyone who tries to get in his way.
 Kim Yoo-ri as Han Yoo-na
A prosecutor who becomes Jo Se-hwang's informant for the sake of her father.

Supporting
 Lee Dae-yeon as Shin Goo-cheol
Shin So-young's father who helps Kang Gon. He is also a veteran investigator.
 Park Won-sang as Goo Dong-yeong: A catholic priest.
 Oh Seung-hoon as Seo Yo-han
A good-looking young detective with a lot of skills who earns the attention of women. Also Shin So-yeong's colleague.
 Kim Byung-ki as Jo Kwan
Jo Se-hwang's father.
 Shin Rin-ah as Kang Da-In
Kang Gon's niece who lost her ability to speak after her parents' deaths.
 Kim Do-hyun as Choi Ho-joon
Leader of the Special Investigation Unit's profiler team and Shin So-young's boss.
 Lee Jung-hyun as Ko Dae-soo
A gangster who is the original owner of the bracelet.
 Kim Min-kyo as Bang Hak-jae
 A thief who is currently serving his term in the prison.
 Im Young-sik
 Lee Sung-woo
 Yuk Jin-soo
 Jung In-gyeom
 Lee Joo-bin

Production
The first script reading was held on September 20, 2018 with the attendance of cast and crew at the MBC in Sangam-dong. The author of the original webtoon was also present.

The lead couple Ju Ji-hoon and Jin Se-yeon have previously worked together in 2012 Five Fingers drama series.

Original soundtrack

Part 1

Part 2

Part 3

Part 4

Part 5

Part 6

Ratings
 In this table,  represent the lowest ratings and  represent the highest ratings.
 N/A denotes that the rating is not known.

Notes

References

External links
  
 
 

MBC TV television dramas
2019 South Korean television series debuts
2019 South Korean television series endings
Korean-language television shows
South Korean mystery television series
South Korean fantasy television series
Television shows based on South Korean webtoons